Osbournby (locally pronounced Ozzenby or Ossenby) is a small village and civil parish in the North Kesteven district of Lincolnshire, England. The population of the civil parish (including Spanby) at the 2011 census was 381.

Adjacent villages include Spanby, Aunsby and Threekingham. In 2001 the village had a population of 358.

The church is dedicated to St Peter and St Paul. The village public house is the Whichcote Arms on London Road (A15). There is a small primary school and nursery in the village.

History  

One Saturday in 1791 a match at foot-ball was played in Osbournby field between the bachelors of Osbournby and Billingboro'; when, after a severe contest of six hours, wherein several feats of agility were shewn, it was decided in favour of the youths of Billingbor'; on which occasion they wore favours of blue ribband, as a mark of their distinction.

References

External links

 History of the village
 Primary school

Villages in Lincolnshire
Civil parishes in Lincolnshire
North Kesteven District